Sheslay is an unincorporated settlement in the far northwestern corner of British Columbia, Canada, located at the mouth of Egnell Creek and the confluence of the Hackett and Sheslay Rivers.

References

Unincorporated settlements in British Columbia
Cassiar Country